is a Japanese voice actress and singer from Chiba Prefecture affiliated with Early Wing. In 2014, she started her career as a singer by joining the band SmileY inc. with Vocaloid musician Yuuyu-P. She also did the voice of Vocaloid character Azuki Masaoka for V4.

Filmography

Anime
2011
YuruYuri as Kyōko Toshinō

2012
Nyaruko: Crawling with Love as Tamao Kurei
Pretty Rhythm: Dear My Future as Yumemi
Yuruyuri♪♪ as Kyōko Toshinō
Say I Love You as Female Student

2013
Ai Mai Mi as Ai Ebihara
Oreshura as Mei Akano
Vividred Operation as Wakaba Saegusa
Nyaruko: Crawling with Love W as Tamao Kurei
Futari wa Milky Holmes as White Phantom

2014
Go! Go! 575 as Azuki Masaoka
Inugami-san to Nekoyama-san as Aki Hiiragi
No-Rin as Akari Suzuki
Wake Up, Girls! as Shiho Iwasaki
Riddle Story of Devil as Mahiru / Shinya Banba
Hanayamata as Tami Nishimikado
Momo Kyun Sword as Karin

2015
Kantai Collection as Kitakami, Ōi
The Idolmaster Cinderella Girls as Kanako Mimura
The Idolmaster Cinderella Girls 2nd Season as Kanako Mimura
YuruYuri San☆Hai! as Kyōko Toshinō

2016
Hundred as Latia Saint-Émilion
Tsukiuta. The Animation as Matsuri Motomiya

2017
The Idolmaster Cinderella Girls Theater as Kanako Mimura (4 seasons from April 2017-June 2019)
Love Tyrant as Mari Shiina

2018
Caligula as Thorn
Uma Musume Pretty Derby as Taiki Shuttle

2019
Why the Hell are You Here, Teacher!? as Saya Matsukaze

2020
Princess Connect! Re:Dive as Shinobu / Shinobu Kamiki

2021
Hortensia Saga as Bernadetta Ober

2022
Girls' Frontline as Intruder
Princess Connect! Re:Dive Season 2 as Shinobu / Shinobu Kamiki

Video games
Onsen Musume as Aloha Iwaki
Caligula as Thorn
Hyperdevotion Noire: Goddess Black Heart as Lee Fey
The Idolmaster Cinderella Girls as Kanako Mimura
Kantai Collection as Ise, Hyuuga, Furutaka, Kako, Ōi, Kitakami, Hiyou, Junyou, Hiburi, Daitou
Magia Record as Corbeau
Sakura-sō no Pet na Kanojo as Otoha Nakano
Lilycle Rainbow Stage!!! as Ibuki Oribe
Pokémon Masters as Leaf
Princess Connect! Re:Dive as Shinobu / Shinobu Kamiki
Yoru, Tomosu as Reiko Takusari
Girls' Frontline as SPP-1, Type 97S, Architect, Intruder 
Uma Musume Pretty Derby as Taiki Shuttle
Blue Archive as Ayumu Iwabitsu
World Flipper as Mia

Dubbing

Animation
  (Tooniverse) – Hari Koo/Koo Hari

References

External links
Official agency profile 

1993 births
Living people
Voice actresses from Chiba Prefecture
Japanese women pop singers
Japanese video game actresses
Japanese voice actresses